Edward "Ed" Botterell (born 24 January 1931) is a Canadian former sailor who competed in the 1964 Summer Olympics.

References

1931 births
Living people
Canadian male sailors (sport)
Olympic sailors of Canada
Sailors at the 1964 Summer Olympics – Dragon